Dmitri Andreyevich Arapov (born 9 June 1993) is a Russian professional football goalkeeper. He plays for FC Irtysh Omsk

Club career
He made his professional debut on 23 May 2015 for FC Ural Sverdlovsk Oblast in a Russian Premier League game against FC Torpedo Moscow when the first-choice Ural goalkeeper Nikolai Zabolotny was sent off for a professional foul. He started in Ural's next league game on 30 May 2015 against FC Terek Grozny as Zabolotny received an automatic one-game suspension for the sending off.

Career statistics

Club

Notes

References

External links
 

1993 births
Sportspeople from Sverdlovsk Oblast
People from Kushva
Living people
Russian footballers
Association football goalkeepers
FC Ural Yekaterinburg players
FC Volgar Astrakhan players
FC Tom Tomsk players
FC Chayka Peschanokopskoye players
FC Irtysh Omsk players
Russian Premier League players
Russian First League players
Russian Second League players